The 1995 Northern Illinois Huskies football team represented Northern Illinois University as a member of the Big West Conference during the 1995 NCAA Division I-A football season. Led by Charlie Sadler in his fifth and final season as head coach, the Huskies compiled an overall record of 3–8 with a mark of 3–3 in conference play, tying for fourth place in the Big West. Northern Illinois played home games at Huskie Stadium in DeKalb, Illinois.

Schedule

References

Northern Illinois
Northern Illinois Huskies football seasons
Northern Illinois Huskies football